Reutov is a town in Moscow Oblast, Russia, located east of Moscow. Population:

History
The exact date of Reutov's foundation is unknown; however, most historians believe that it was founded between 1492 and 1495. In the 17th-18th centuries, the village of Reutovo belonged to the dynasties of Prince Turenin and Prince Vasily Dolgorukov. At the beginning of the 18th century, Reutovo became a village. Census Book of 1709 has a record of the village of Reutovo, owned by the Prince Vasily Dolgorukov.

In 1787, the village was acquired by Prince N. I. Maslov. Under his rule Reutovo became a luxurious country estate. At the beginning of the 19th century, Prince Maslov went bankrupt and the village became a property of Lt. Col. A. M. Pokhvistnev who in 1824 built a cotton mill. Yarn from the factory was among the best in Russia and won a gold medal at the All-Russian National Show in 1831. Shortly after that Pokhvistnev sold the land and the mill.

In 1843, the land and the cotton mill was purchased by S. A. Mazurin, a Moscow merchant. He built a brick factory, dormitories, and restructured the cotton mill gradually forming a factory town of Reutovo.

Since 1955, Reutov is the host for NPO Mashinostroyeniya, formerly known as USSR Experimental Design Bureau #52, where development of various robotic and manned space satellites, ICBMs, cruise missiles takes place; the longtime director was Vladimir Chelomey.

The town is separated from Moscow by the Moscow Ring Road and Nosovikhinskoye Highway. Reutov has the status of a science-town (naukograd) and celebrates its anniversary on the last Saturday of September.

Administrative and municipal status
Within the framework of administrative divisions, it is incorporated as Reutov Town Under Oblast Jurisdiction—an administrative unit with the status equal to that of the districts. As a municipal division, Reutov Town Under Oblast Jurisdiction is incorporated as Reutov Urban Okrug.

Transportation

Buses and route taxis
Unlike in other cities and towns of Moscow Oblast, public transport is fully serviced by Mosgortrans (State unitary company "Moscow city transport") but always without suburban fare. The only 28 bus is serviced by Balashikha. The transports connect
From the west: to metro Novogireyevo
From the south: with districts Novokosino, Kosino, Lubertsy and Kazansky railway.
From the north: to metro Pervomayskaya

Railway and metro
Railway station Reutovo is 5 stops (approx 20 mins) by commuter train (elektrichka) from Moscow Kursky Rail Terminal.

Metro station of Novokosino is 7 stations from the centre of Moscow city.

Twin towns and sister cities

Reutov is twinned with:
 Mansfield, United Kingdom
 Nesvizh, Belarus

References

Sources

Reutov
Cities and towns in Moscow Oblast
Moskovsky Uyezd
Naukograds